Santeri Pakkanen (born 7 May 1998) is a Finnish professional footballer who most recently played for Lahti, as a goalkeeper.

Career
Pakkanen has played for Lahti and Lahti Akatemia.

References

1998 births
Living people
Finnish footballers
FC Lahti players
FC Kuusysi players
Kakkonen players
Veikkausliiga players
Association football goalkeepers